A human–electric hybrid vehicle is a hybrid vehicle, or more specifically a hybrid human-powered vehicle, whose drivetrain consists of a human being and an electric motor/generator (and one or more electricity-storage device(s) such as a battery(ies) or ultracapacitor(s)). Some vehicles are able to operate off both human power and be plugged in to operate on battery power.

It  can have characteristics of a bicycle, velomobile or other lightweight human operated vehicles with the addition of faster acceleration and regenerative braking, allowing a higher average velocity, especially in hilly terrain.

Some vehicles have a clutch and three or more wheels, allowing the operator to continue pedaling and charge up the electricity-storage device during traffic stops.

See also



References

Hybrid vehicles
Human-powered vehicles
Electric vehicles